Revolution is a 2016 comic book storyline published by IDW Publishing, that ran from September to November 2016. The story involves characters from various Hasbro franchises.

Plot

Main story
Several months after Optimus Prime's controversial annexation of Earth into the Cybertronian Council of Worlds, the political situation remains volatile as humanity struggles to come to terms with the actions of the Transformers, viewing them with distrust. The tensions heighten after Earth's deposits of Ore-13 start to rapidly destabilize, threatening the planet with nuclear annihilation.

Believing the Autobots to be responsible, the President of the United States makes the decision to reactivate America's highly trained special mission force G.I. Joe to counterattack. Unbeknownst to the government, G.I. Joe's ranks have been infiltrated by an entirely different race of alien shapeshifters: the evil wizards known as Dire Wraiths – also drawn to Earth's supplies of Ore-13 – in a conspiracy that spreads all the way up to Joe Colton himself. The Wraith masquerading as Colton contacts his old Adventure Team friend Miles Manheim, hoping to reverse-engineer captured Cybertronian assets into a mechanical strike force in order to fight back. Manheim, however, has cut a deal with the extradimensional conqueror known as Baron Karza - in exchange for Earth's deposits of Ore-13 to save Karza's dimension from a destructive entropy storm, Manheim will receive dominion over Earth.

When the Autobot base Metrotitan abruptly goes silent, Optimus Prime calls Windblade to Earth in the hopes of using her cityspeaking skills to diagnose the problem. Before long, however, Prime and his allies are dispatched to Portland when Joe Colton takes the fight to Transformers. The battle is interrupted by Rom the Space Knight, who annihilates the Wraiths within the ranks of the Joes and forces the Autobots to pursue the alien. Meanwhile, Kup and Aileron discover the true problem with Ore-13, but are ambushed by M.A.S.K., with Miles Mayhem taking Kup prisoner.

Optimus and Rom reach an understanding and the Space Knight accompanies them back to Metrotitan, just as Windblade returns from a mental voyage into Microspace, where she encountered its progenitor Micronus Prime. Her desire to save this dying dimension runs up against Optimus Prime's orders to protect Earth first, but Rom's recklessness prompts Prime to realize that both Earth and Microspace must be saved; meanwhile, in Microspace, the adventurous Micronauts head into the fray as part of a deal with Baron Karza.

Meanwhile, the restless Decepticon Thundercracker finds himself protecting the President and her entourage from a team of Dire Wraiths. The extraterrestrial activity on Earth prompts the attention of the UK-based Action Man Programme, prompting them to deploy their top agent, Ian Noble, to retrieve Kup from beneath Governor's Island. Ian and Kup form a friendship as they return to Monument Valley, now under siege by the combined forces of M.A.S.K. and the Dire Wraiths.

As the battle intensifies, Baron Karza finally reveals himself as the perpetrator behind it all. Being enhanced by the Ore-13, Karza fuses with Wraith magic and M.A.S.K. technology to transform himself into a colossal monster. The arrival of G.I. Joe turns the advantage towards the Autobots and their allies; with the help of the Micronauts and repentant M.A.S.K. pilot Matt Trakker, they succeed in forcing Karza back into his dimension, ending the threat to Earth.

Subplot
A side story focuses on the adventures of the Scavengers as they head to Earth so that Crankcase can go on a date with a friendly Dire Wraith he met online.

Aftermath
The aftermath of Revolution marks the beginning of the Hasbro Reconstruction initiative, converging the stories featured in the Transformers and G.I. Joe comic books, with the addition of new comic books based on Micronauts, Rom, Action Man, and M.A.S.K.: Mobile Armored Strike Kommand within the Hasbro Comic Book Universe.

Titles involved

"The Road to Revolution"

Main issues

Collected editions

Spin-off
In 2017, IDW released a miniseries titled Aw Yeah Revolution!, written and drawn by Art Baltazar, which represents a humorous version of the events of Revolution. The series was cancelled after three issues.

Sequel
In April 2017, IDW and Hasbro announced a new crossover event titled First Strike and it will serve as the sequel to Revolution.

Other media
On July 10, 2017, Hasbro announced to release a toy set titled Revolution Comic Crossover Preview Mega-Set as an anticipation to IDW's First Strike, and features sixteen figures from Transformers, G.I. Joe, Rom, Micronauts, Action Man, M.A.S.K., and Visionaries.

References

External links 
 Revolution - IDW Publishing

2016 comics debuts
2016 comics endings
Comics based on Hasbro toys
Crossover comics
G.I. Joe comics
IDW Publishing titles
Transformers comics
Parallel universes in fiction
Rom the Space Knight